Sarat Chandra Chattopadhyay, also spelt as Sarat Chandra Chatterjee and Saratchandra Chatterji (15 September 1876 or ৩১ শে ভাদ্র ১২৮৩ বঙ্গাব্দ  – 16 January 1938), was a Bengali novelist and short story writer of the early 20th century. Most of his works deal with the lifestyle, tragedy and struggle of the village people and the contemporary social practices that prevailed in Bengal. He remains the most popular, translated, and adapted Indian author of all time.

Early life 
Sarat Chandra Chattopadhyay was born on 15 September 1876 (৩১ শে ভাদ্র, ১২৮৩ বঙ্গাব্দ), in a Bengali Brahmin family in Debanandapur, a small village in Hooghly, West Bengal. His father Matilal and mother Bhuvanmohini had five children—two daughters (Anila and Sushila) and three sons (Sarat Chandra, Prabhas Chandra, and Prakash Chandra). Sarat Chandra was their second child.

Sarat Chandra's grandfather was a very wealthy man but he lost everything. The Preface of his monumental book Srikanta quotes him:

"My childhood and youth were passed in great poverty. I received almost no education for want of means. From my father I inherited nothing except, as I believe, his restless spirit and his keen interest in literature. The first made me a tramp and sent me out tramping the whole of India quite early, and the second made me a dreamer all my life. Father was a great scholar, and he had tried his hand at stories and novels, dramas and poems, in short, every branch of literature, but never could finish anything. I have not his work now—somehow it got lost; but I remember poring over those incomplete mss. over and over again in my childhood, and many a night I kept awake regretting their incompleteness and thinking what might have been their conclusion if finished. Probably this led to my writing short stories when I was barely seventeen."

Poverty forced the family to live for long periods in Bhuvanmohini's father Kedarnath Gangopadhyay's home in Bhagalpur, Bihar.

Sarat Chandra was a daring, adventure-loving boy. His education began at an informal village school [pathsala] and later he joined Hooghly Branch High School. He was a good student and got a double promotion that enabled him to skip a grade. He passed his Entrance Examination (public examination at the end of Class X) in 1894. He entered Tejnarayan Jubilee College. He tutored a relative's children who paid his tuition in return. After two years' study, he could not take his F.A. (First Arts) public examination as he could not pay the twenty rupees examination fee.  

After dropping out of formal studies, he spent much of his time interacting with friends, acting in plays, and in playing sports and games. He wrote several of his famous works  during this period. And then he stopped writing: "But I soon gave up the habit as useless, and almost forgot in the long years that followed that I could even write a sentence in my boyhood."

On wife's death, Matilal left the house of his in-laws and moved the family to a mud house in Bhagalpur. Sometime later, Sarat Chandra left home in the guise of a sannyasin (monk) and wandered from place to place. Little is known about what he did during this period. On getting the news of his father's death, Sarat Chandra did his shraddha (memorial service), deposited his family with a friend and relatives, and went to Calcutta (today's Kolkata) to try out his luck.

Life in Calcutta and Burma 
In Calcutta, Sarat Chandra worked for six months translating Hindi paper books into English for an advocate. In January 1903, he went to Burma. He held sundry jobs in Rangoon and Pegu. He eventually found work in Burma Public Works Accounts Office in Rangoon.

Most of his stay in Rangoon was in a neighbourhood where mistris (manual workers, mechanics, craftsmen, artisans) lived. He freely mixed with them. He wrote their job applications, mediated conflicts, gave them homeopathic medicine for free, even gave monetary help. The mistris had great respect for him. 

Sarat Chandra’s neighbour downstairs was a Bengali mistri who had arranged his daughter’s marriage to an alcoholic. The daughter Shanti Chakrabarty begged him to rescue her. Sarat Chandra married her and they had a child. He was devastated when his wife and one-year old son passed away from plague in Rangoon. Sometime later, a Bengali mistri friend Krishna Das Adhikari, requested him to marry his teenage daughter. Sarat Chandra eventually agreed. He renamed his wife Hironmoyee and taught her to read and write. She outlived him by 23 years. They did not have any children.

During his stay in Rangoon, Sarat Chandra read widely, painted, and was into music. And he resumed writing after a gap of about eighteen years: "Some of my old acquaintances started a little magazine, but no one of note would condescend to contribute to it, as it was so small and insignificant. When almost hopeless, some of them suddenly remembered me, and after much persuasion they succeeded in extracting from me a promise to write for it. This was in the year 1913. I promised most unwillingly—perhaps only to put them off till I had returned to Rangoon and could forget all about it. But sheer volume and force of their letters and telegrams compelled me at last to think seriously about writing again. I sent them a short story, for their magazine Jamuna. This became at once extremely popular, and made me famous in one day. Since then I have been writing regularly. In Bengal perhaps I am the only fortunate writer who has not had to struggle."

In 1916, he resigned from his job due to ill health and moved to Calcutta.

House of Chattopadhyay

After returning from Burma, Chattopadhyay stayed for 11 years in Baje Shibpur, Howrah. Then he made a house in the village of Samta, in 1923, where he spent the later twelve years of his life as a novelist. His house is known as Sarat Chandra Kuthi. The two-storied Burmese style house was also home to Sarat Chandra's brother, Swami Vedananda, who was a disciple at Belur Math. His and his brother's samadhi are within the house's compound. Trees like bamboo and guava planted by the renowned author still stand tall in the gardens of the house.

Impact and Legacy

J. D. Anderson's Views

James Drummond Anderson, who was a member of the prestigious Indian Civil Service of British India and a leading authority on several Indian languages, was an early admirer of Sarat Chandra. In an article entitled “A New Bengali Writer” in the Times Literary Supplement dated 11 July 1918, Anderson writes: “His knowledge of the ways and thoughts and language of women and children, his power of transferring these vividly to the printed page, are such as are rare indeed in any country. In India, and especially in the great “joint family” residences of Bengal, swarming with women of all ages and babies of all sizes, there is a form of speech appropriated to women’s needs, which Mr. [Rudyard] Kipling somewhere describes as choti boli, the “little language.” Of this Mr. Chatterjee is an admirable master, to an extent indeed not yet attained, we believe, by any other Indian writer.

Anderson comments about Sarat Chandra’s fondness for the past: “Mr. Chatterjee is much too true an artist to allow his gift of kindly yet scrupulously accurate observation to be distracted by social or political prejudice. He is, we gather, on the whole inclined towards a sane conservatism: he remains a Hindu at heart in a country whose whole civilization is based on Hindu culture. He has, we dimly suspect, his doubts as to the wisdom and working of Europeanized versions of the old religion and the old customs. But he is so keen and amused a spectator of the life about him, whether in cosmopolitan Calcutta or in somnolent little villages buried in dense verdure among the sunny ricefields, that it is not without doubts and diffidence that we attribute to him a tendency to praise past times and comfortable old conventions.”

Regarding Sarat Chandra’s popularity, he noted: “It is of excellent omen that Mr. Chatterjee's art has received such instant and wide appreciation in his own country Let us hope that in other Indian provinces there are rising authors as keenly observant and gifted with a like faculty of easy and natural expression.”

About the difficulties of translating his work, Anderson opines: “It may be doubted whether Mr. Chatterjee’s tales can be adequately rendered into English, and therefore, perhaps, some apology is due to English readers who may never come across any of the work of this talented young Bengali.” Anderson planned to translate his works. But he died in 1920 and the translations never happened.

Views of Indian Writers and Academics

The phenomenal popularity of Sarat Chandra Chattopadhyay has been attested by some of the most prominent writers as well as literary critics across India in their writings. Most of the authors in Assam and Odisha, at least before the Independence, read him admiringly in original Bengali; rest of India read him in translations in varying quality. 

Publishers were never tired of reprinting his works; he remains the most translated, the most adapted and the most plagiarized author. His novels also reached a number of people through the medium of film and he is still an important force in Indian cinema. O. N. V. Kurup writes "...Sarat Chandra's name is cherished as dearly as the names of eminent Malayalam novelists. His name has been a household word". Dr Mirajkar informs "the translations of Sarat Chandra created a stir amongst the readers and writers all over Maharashtra. He has become a known literary personality in Maharashtra in the rank of any popular Marathi writers including H. N. Apte, V. S. Khandekar, N. S. Phadke and G. T. Madkholkar". 

Jainendra Kumar, who considers that his contribution towards the creation and preservation of cultural India is second, perhaps, only to that of Gandhi, asks a rhetorical question summing up Sarat Chandra's position and presumably the role of translation and inter-literary relationship: "Sarat Chandra was a writer in Bengali; but where is that Indian language in which he did not become the most popular when he reached it?"

Films

His works have been made into around fifty films in many Indian languages. Particularly, his novel Devdas has been made into sixteen versions, from Bengali, Hindi to Telugu. Parineeta has also been made thrice in Hindi. In 1957 Bardidi was made by director Ajoy Kar. Rajlakshmi O Srikanta and Indranath Srikanta O Annadadidi by Haridas Bhattacharya in 1958 and 1959 respectively, Majhli Didi (1967) by Hrishikesh Mukherjee and Swami (1977), for which he was awarded the Filmfare Award for Best Story, are other adaptations. Another famous film Chhoti Bahu (1971) is based on his novel Bindur Chhele. His novel 'Datta' was adapted into a Bengali film as Datta (film) in 1951 directed by Saumyen Mukhopadhyay starring Sunanda Banerjee and Manoranjan Bhattacharyya with Ahindra Choudhury as Rashbehari, and again in 1976 starring Suchitra Sen and Soumitra Chatterjee. The film Sabyasachi (film) was released in 1977 based on his work Pather Dabi.
The other movies based on his novel were Nishkriti, and Apne Paraye (1980) by Basu Chatterjee, starring Amol Palekar. The Telugu film Thodi Kodallu (1957) is also based on this novel. Gulzar's 1975 film, Khushboo is majorly inspired by his work Pandit Mashay. The 1961 Telugu film Vagdanam by Acharya Aatreya is loosely based on his novel Datta. Also the 2011 film Aalo Chhaya is based on his short story, Aalo O Chhaya.'Chandranath'is also another film made based on his novel in the year 1957 and Suchitra Sen and Uttam Kumar played the main role.

Awards

Bibliography 
Sarat Chandra wrote novels, novellas, and stories. Sarat Chandra used to visit village after village, mingle with the local people and outside Bengal, in foreign, he spent several days and the experience which he gathered was the reason of his unique and elegant style of his literary works.

His first novel was Badadidi (1907), which was published in the Bharati and made him well known. He went on to write several stories and novels, including 
Bindur Chhele O Anyanya (1914)
Parinita (1916)
Baikunther Will (1916)
Pallisomaj (1916)
Devdas (1917)
Choritrohin (1917)
Nishkrti (1917)
Shrikanta (Part 1–4, 1917–1933)
Datta (1918)
Grihadaha (1920)
Dena-Paona (1923)
Pother Dabi (1926)
Shes Proshno (1931)
 
He also wrote essays, which were anthologized in Narir Mulya (1923) and Svadesh O Sahitya (1932). Shrikanta, Charitrahin, Devdas, Grihadaha, Dena-Paona and Pather Dabi are among his most popular works. Pather Dabi was banned by the British Government because of its revolutionary theme. His posthumous publications include Chhelebelar Galpa, Shubhada (1938), Sheser Parichay (1939), Sharat Chandrer Granthabali (1948) and Sharat Chandrer Aprakashita Rachanabali (1951).

He wrote some essays including Narir Itihas (The History of Women) and Narir Mulya (The Value of Women). Narir Itihas, which was lost in a house fire, contained a history of women on the lines of Spencer's Descriptive Sociology. While the second, Narir Mulya gives a theory of women's rights in the context of Mill's and Spencer's arguments.

Stories
 Aalo O Chhaya
 Abhagir Swargo
 Anupamar Prem
 Anuradha
 Andhare Aalo
 Balya Smriti
 Bilashi
 Bindur Chhele, (Bindu's Son) 1913
 Bojha
 Cheledhora
 Chobi
 Darpochurno (Broken Pride)
 Ekadoshi Bairagi
 Kashinath
 Haricharan
 Harilakshmi
 Lalu (parts 1, 2, and 3)
 Mamlar Phol
 Mandir
 Mahesh (The Drought)
 Mejdidi
 Bochor Panchash Purber Ekti Kahini
 Paresh
 Path Nirdesh
 Ramer Shumoti, (Ram's Good Sense) 1914
 Sati
 Swami (The Husband)

Plays
Sarat Chandra converted three of his works into plays. 
 Bijoya
 Rama
 Shoroshi
 Jai hind

Essays
 Narir Mulya
 Swadesh O Sahitya
 Taruner Bidroho

Other works
 Dehati Samaj, 1920
 Sharoda (published posthumously)

Biography
Awara Masiha ' (in Hindi) by Vishnu PrabhakarGreat Vagabond: Biography and Immortal Works of Sarat Chandra ChatterjeeSee also
 Films based on works by Sarat Chandra Chattopadhyay
 Samtaber, the village where Sarat Chandra spent his life's early years as a novelist
 Sarat Chandra Kuthi, the house of Sarat Chandra at Samtaber
 List of Indian writers

 References 
 

 Notes 
 
 Ganguly, Swagato. "Introduction". In Parineeta by Saratchandra Chattopadhyay. New Delhi: Penguin Books, 2005. (English translation)
 Guha, Sreejata. "Introduction". In Devdas by Saratchandra Chattopadhyay. New Delhi: Penguin Books, 2002. (English translation)
 Roy, Gopalchandra. Saratchandra, Ananda Publishers Pvt. Ltd., Kolkata
 Sarat Rachanabali, Ananda Publishers Pvt. Ltd., Kolkata
 Prithwindra Mukherjee. "Introduction" in Mahesh et autres nouvelles by Saratchandra Chatterji. Paris: Unesco/Gallimard, 1978. (French translation of Mahesh, Bindur chhele and Mejdidi by Prithwindra Mukherjee. Foreword by Jean Filliozat)
 Dutt, A. K. and Dhussa, R. "Novelist Sarat Chandra's perception of his Bengali home region: a literary geographic study". Springer Link
 Sil, Narasingha Prasad. The life of Sharatchandra Chattopadhyay: drifter and dreamer. Fairleigh Dickinson University Press, 2012.
 Das, Sisir Kumar, "A History of Indian Literature 1911–1956: Struggle for Freedom: Triumph and Tragedy", South Asia Books (1 September 1995), 

 External links 

  
 The man behind Devdas, Parineeta'
 
Saratchandra Chattopadhyay: Literary Giant who is Timeless

Writers from Kolkata
Sarat Chandra Chattopadhyay
1876 births
1938 deaths
20th-century Indian novelists
People from Howrah
Bengali writers
Bengali Hindus
Indian male novelists
Bengali-language writers
University of Calcutta alumni
Poets from West Bengal
Novelists from West Bengal
20th-century Indian short story writers
20th-century Indian male writers
Deaths from liver cancer
Writers in British India